Yukiya is a masculine Japanese given name.

Possible writings
Yukiya can be written using different combinations of kanji characters. Here are some examples: 

幸矢, "happiness, arrow"
幸也, "happiness, to be"
幸椰, "happiness, coconut tree"
幸弥, "happiness, increasingly"
幸哉, "happiness, how (interrogative particle)"
行矢, "to go, arrow"
行也, "to go, to be"
行哉, "to go, how (interrogative particle)"
行弥, "to go, increasingly"
之矢, "of, arrow"
之弥, "of, increasingly"
志也, "determination, to be"
恭也, "respectful, to be"
雪矢, "snow, arrow"
有起哉, "to have, to rise, how (interrogative particle)"

The name can also be written in hiragana ゆきや or katakana ユキヤ.

Notable people with the name

, Japanese diplomat
, Japanese cyclist
, Japanese mayor
, Japanese actor
, Japanese ski jumper
, Japanese footballer
, Japanese footballer
, Japanese table tennis player

Japanese masculine given names